Wierzbno may refer to the following places in Poland:
Wierzbno, a district of Warsaw
Wierzbno, Lower Silesian Voivodeship (south-west Poland)
Wierzbno, Lesser Poland Voivodeship (south Poland)
Wierzbno, Masovian Voivodeship (east-central Poland)
Wierzbno, Ostrów Wielkopolski County in Greater Poland Voivodeship (west-central Poland)
Wierzbno, Słupca County in Greater Poland Voivodeship (west-central Poland)
Wierzbno, Lubusz Voivodeship (west Poland)
Wierzbno, Głubczyce County in Opole Voivodeship (south-west Poland)
Wierzbno, Nysa County in Opole Voivodeship (south-west Poland)
Wierzbno, West Pomeranian Voivodeship (north-west Poland)